The 2010 Moorilla Hobart International was a tennis tournament played on outdoor hard courts. It was the 17th edition of the event and is part of the WTA International tournaments of the 2010 WTA Tour. It took place at the Hobart International Tennis Centre in Hobart, Australia from 10 through 16 January 2010.

WTA entrants

Seeds

 as of 4 January 2010

Other entrants
The following players received wildcards into the singles main draw:
  Sophie Ferguson
  Alicia Molik
  Olivia Rogowska

The following players received entry into the singles main draw through qualifying:
  Elena Baltacha
  Kirsten Flipkens
  Alla Kudryavtseva
  Roberta Vinci

Champions

Singles

 Alona Bondarenko def.  Shahar Pe'er, 6–2, 6–4.
It was Bondarenko's first title of the year and second of her career.

Doubles

 Chuang Chia-jung /  Květa Peschke def.  Chan Yung-jan /  Monica Niculescu, 3–6, 6–3, 10–7.

External links
Official website

 
Moorilla Hobart International
Moor
Hobart International